Leah Paul (born 10 September 1999) is an Irish cricketer. She made her Women's One Day International cricket (WODI) debut against India in the 2017 South Africa Quadrangular Series on 7 May 2017. In November 2018, she was named the Female Youth International Player of the Year at the annual Cricket Ireland Awards. She plays in the Women's Super Series for Dragons.

In May 2019, she was named in Ireland's Women's Twenty20 International (WT20I) squad for their series against the West Indies, but she did not play. In August 2019, she was named in the Irish Women's Twenty20 International (WT20I) squad for the 2019 Netherlands Women's Quadrangular Series. She made her WT20I debut for Ireland, against the Netherlands, on 8 August 2019.

In August 2019, she was named in Ireland's squad for the 2019 ICC Women's World Twenty20 Qualifier tournament in Scotland. In July 2020, she was awarded a non-retainer contract by Cricket Ireland for the following year. In November 2021, she was named in Ireland's team for the 2021 Women's Cricket World Cup Qualifier tournament in Zimbabwe.

References

External links
 
 

1999 births
Living people
Cricketers from Dublin (city)
Irish women cricketers
Ireland women One Day International cricketers
Ireland women Twenty20 International cricketers
Scorchers (women's cricket) cricketers
Typhoons (women's cricket) cricketers
Dragons (women's cricket) cricketers